is a freelance Japanese voice actor and narrator, born and raised in Fushimi-ku, Kyoto. He is best known for his roles in Choja Raideen (as Raideen Owl), the Sonic series (as Shadow the Hedgehog), Bleach (as Gin Ichimaru), Battle Vixens (as Zuo Ci and Xu Huang), Majin Tantei Nōgami Neuro (as Eiji Sasazuka), Zettai Karen Children (as Kyōsuke Hyōbu) and Kamen Rider Den-O (as Urataros).

Biography
When Yusa was a child, he lived near the Kyoto Racecourse (Yodo, Fushimi-ku, Kyoto). As a gift for entering junior high school, he received a boombox and listened to radio dramas, which inspired him to become a voice actor. When he was in college, he majored in Japanese language studies. After graduating from college, he went through the 7th class of Katsuta Voice Actor Academy and made his debut as a voice actor in 1993 (at the age of 25). His anime debut work was The Brave of Gold Goldran. At the time of his debut, he belonged to Office Kaoru, and since leaving the company, he has been working freelance. He mainly works as a dubbing artist for anime, drama CDs, and foreign films, and often does narration for information programs. In addition to his main job as a voice actor, he has been working more and more on events and radio, and his personal side has become more widely known.

Yusa won the Synergy Award for Kamen Rider Den-O at the 2nd Seiyu Awards.

He married voice actress, Kanako Mitsuhashi in 2007 and he announced on his radio program that they divorced in 2012.

Filmography

Television animation
1992
Crayon Shin-chan – Salary man, Shō's father, masseur, others

1993
Shima Shima Tora no Shimajirō – Caster

1995
Bonobono – Nan Nan
Slayers – Guard

1996
After War Gundam X – Demar Griffe
Brave Command Dagwon – Announcer, young pupil, delinquent
Choja Raideen – Ginga Torikai/Raideen Owl
Detective Conan – Ginji Tobita, Toshiya Tadokoro, Tetsuya Kawasaki, Hisashi Suguro, Ryōsuke Shiina, Damu official, fireman, judge #A, police station official, Nagasaku Shiro and Dogo Hoshikawa

1997
Clamp School Detectives – Black-suited man #D
The King of Braves GaoGaiGar – Steering committee
Pokémon – Yūji, Mitsuji

1998
DT Eightron – Beruku
Lost Universe – Aku Gaki

1999
Angel Links – Nikora
Crest of the Stars – Larnia
Dai-Guard – Makise
Initial D Second Stage – Thunders, others
Turn A Gundam – Laborer #A, farmer #B, militia soldier #B

2000
Banner of the Stars – Larnia
Boogiepop Phantom – Takashi
Fighting Spirit – Test student

2001
Baki the Grappler – Gaia Nomura
Earth Maiden Arjuna – Adjutant #C
Hikaru no Go – Michio Shirakawa, Kyōhei Katagiri, liege lord, others
Rune Soldier – Hero, adventurer #B
The SoulTaker – Operator
Star Ocean: The Second Story – Keith

2002
Atashin'chi – Math teacher, daughter's boyfriend, bus driver, salesman, instructor, others
Full Metal Panic!: The Second Raid – Tony
Hungry Heart: Wild Striker – Haruki Ōmura, Minoru Fujimori, Koboku, others
Papuwa – Gionkamen Arashiyama, Kimura, Nagara River Cormorant

2003
Transformers: Armada – Demolishor(Japanese:Ironhide), Thrust
Astro Boy: Mighty Atom – Blues, staff member, pilot
Kino's Journey – Salary man
Sonic X – Shadow the Hedgehog
The World of Narue – Shimada owner

2004
AM Driver – Scene Pierce
Battle B-Daman – Bodyguard
Black Jack – Doctor
Shura no Toki: Age of Chaos – Takato Mutsu, Asanosuke, Tōkichi
Transformers: Energon – Ironhide/Irontread, Wing Dagger/Wing Saber
Yakitate!! Japan – Edward Kaiser
Yu-Gi-Oh! GX – Fubuki Tenjoin

2005
Bleach – Gin Ichimaru
Blood+ – Gudolf, Archer Research Aide
Doraemon – Man
Eyeshield 21 – Rui Habashira, Shigeru Miyake, Simon
Ginga Legend Weed – Buruge

2006
Chaotic – Codemaster Crellan
Ergo Proxy – Vincent Law
Gintama – Ayumu Tōjō
Nana – Nishimoto
Night Head Genesis – Kamiyashi
Saiunkoku Monogatari – Doushu
Shijō Saikyō no Deshi Kenichi – Ikeshita

2007
Claymore – Isley
Dennō Coil – Sōsuke
Goshūshō-sama Ninomiya-kun – Tasuku Okushiro
Ikki Tousen Dragon Destiny – Zuo Ci, Xu Huang
Koutetsu Sangokushi – Zhuge Jin, messenger, Gorotsuki
Les Misérables: Shōjo Cosette – Montparnasse
Majin Tantei Nōgami Neuro – Eishi Sasazuka
MapleStory – Aroaro
The Story of Saiunkoku – Hanasana
Tetsuko no Tabi – Group

2008
Amatsuki – Kon Shinonome
Dazzle – Jenfūpu
Ikki Tousen Great Guardians – Zuo Ci
Kuroshitsuji – Lau
Persona -trinity soul- – Kiyofumi Nagai
Special A – Aoi Ogata
Zettai Karen Children – Kyōsuke Hyōbu
Yes! PreCure 5 – Count Rozetto

2009
Chrome Shelled Regios – Roy Entorio
Eden of the East – Jintarō Tsuji
Tegami Bachi Reverse – Lawrence
Umineko no Naku Koro ni – Juza Amakusa

2010
Hakuōki – Sanosuke Harada
Hanamaru Kindergarten – Hanamaru Sensei
Nurarihyon no Mago – Nurarihyon (young)
Ookami Kakushi – Shunichirou Sakaki
Seikon no Qwaser – Georg Tanner
Starry Sky – Mizushima Iku

2011
Blue Exorcist – Renzou Shima
B-Daman Crossfire – Force=Dragren
Gyakkyō Burai Kaiji: Hakairoku-hen – Tomohiro Miyoshi
Kore wa Zombie Desu ka? – King of the Night
Nurarihyon no Mago: Sennen Makyo – Nurarihyon (young)
Tiger & Bunny – Yuri Petrov/Lunatic
Uta no Prince-sama Maji Love 1000% (Season 1), Ryuuya Hyuuga

2012
Smile PreCure! - Koichi Nozawa
Arcana Famiglia – Jolly
Fairy Tail the Movie: The Phoenix Priestess – Chase
Kingdom – Bì
Sword Art Online – Kuradeel
Koi to Senkyo to Chocolate – Reiji Saga
Zetman – Seiji Haitani

2013
Blood Lad – Papladon Achim
Kara no Kyoukai – Cornelius Alba
Karneval – Tsukitachi
Shingeki no Kyojin: Kuinaki Sentaku – Farlan Church
Space Battleship Yamato 2199 – Kiyoshi Tooyama
Tokyo Ravens – Ōtomo Jin
Uta no Prince-sama Maji Love 2000% (Season 2), Ryuuya Hyuuga
Yowamushi Pedal – Akira Midōsuji
The Unlimited: Hyōbu Kyōsuke – Kyōsuke Hyōbu

2014
Yo-kai Watch - Fumika's Father
Donten ni Warau – Kotaro Fuma
Gundam Build Fighters Try – Daiki Miyaga
Hozuki's Coolheadedness – Hakutaku
The Irregular at Magic High School – Zhou Gongjin
Pupa – Shirō Onijima
Terra Formars – Adolf Reinhardt
Tokyo Ghoul – Tatara

2015
Atashin'chi – Math teacher, daughter's boyfriend, bus driver, salesman, instructor, others
Gangsta. –  Domenico Arcangelo
GATE – Akira Yanagida
Overlord – Brain Unglaus
Q Transformers: Return of the Mystery of Convoy – Jazz
Anti-Magic Academy: The 35th Test Platoon – Haunted
Uta no Prince-sama Maji Love Revolutions (Season 3) – Ryuuya Hyuuga
Working!!! – Tohru Minegishi
Young Black Jack – Yabu

2016
Divine Gate – Loki
Drifters – Flamme
Haven't You Heard? I'm Sakamoto – Shou Hayabusa/8823
Izetta: The Last Witch – Görtz
Maho Girls PreCure! – Batty
Mob Psycho 100 – Shinji Kamuro
Norn9 - Itsuki Kagami
Puzzle & Dragons X – Jest
Servamp – Johannes Mimir Faustus
Uta no Prince-sama Maji Love Legend Star (Season 4) – Ryuuya Hyuuga

2017
ACCA: 13-Territory Inspection Dept. – Lilium
Fate/Apocrypha – Lancer of Red/Karna
Vatican Miracle Examiner – Priest Julia
Yowamushi Pedal: New Generation – Akira Midōsuji

2018
Magical Girl Ore – Hyoue
The Seven Deadly Sins: Revival of The Commandments – Grayroad
Radiant – Dragunov

2019
Dororo – Sabame
The Morose Mononokean II – Gyousei
Midnight Occult Civil Servants – Reiji Senda

2020
Pet – Ron
Kuma Kuma Kuma Bear – Cliff Foschurose
Talentless Nana – Jin Tachibana

2021
Ex-Arm – Shūichi Natsume
High-Rise Invasion – Kazuma Aohara
The Case Study of Vanitas – Johann
Seirei Gensouki: Spirit Chronicles – Reiss Vulfe
Battle Game in 5 Seconds – Masaya Kuroiwa
Dragon Quest: The Adventure of Dai – Fenbren
The Faraway Paladin – Tonio

2022
Ranking of Kings – Ōken
Trapped in a Dating Sim: The World of Otome Games Is Tough for Mobs – Chris Fia Arclight
Bleach: Thousand-Year Blood War – Gin Ichimaru

Television live-action
Kamen Rider Ryuki (2002) Hyper Battle Video – Evil Agito Burning Form
Mahou Sentai Magiranger – Hades Beastman King of Hell Yeti Zee　(ep. 27 - 30)
Kamen Rider Kabuto (2006) Hyper Battle Video – Gatack Zecter
Kamen Rider Den-O (2007) – Urataros/Kamen Rider Den-O Rod Form　(eps. 5 - 49), Newt Imagin　(ep. 40)
Kamen Rider Den-O: I'm Born! (2007) – Urataros/Kamen Rider Den-O Rod Form
Kamen Rider Den-O & Kiva: Climax Deka (2008) – Urataros/Kamen Rider Den-O Rod Form
Kamen Rider Kiva: King of the Castle in the Demon World (2008) – Shogi Player (cameo)
Saraba Kamen Rider Den-O: Final Countdown (2008) – Urataros/Kamen Rider Den-O Rod Form
Kamen Rider Decade (2009) – Urataros/Kamen Rider Den-O Rod Form
Cho Kamen Rider Den-O & Decade Neo Generations: The Onigashima Warship (2009) – Urataros/Kamen Rider Den-O Rod Form
Kamen Rider × Kamen Rider × Kamen Rider The Movie: Cho-Den-O Trilogy (2010) – Urataros/Kamen Rider Den-O Rod Form/Uratazao
OOO, Den-O, All Riders: Let's Go Kamen Riders (2011) – Urataros
Kamen Rider × Super Sentai: Super Hero Taisen (2012) – Urataros/Kamen Rider Den-O Rod Form, Kamen Rider Accel
Kamen Rider × Super Sentai: Ultra Super Hero Taisen (2017) – Urataros/Kamen Rider Den-O Rod Form
Kamen Rider Heisei Generations Forever (2018) – Urataros/Kamen Rider Den-O Rod Form
Kamen Rider Zi-O (2019) – Urataros (ep. 39 - 40)

Original video animation (OVA)
Hunter × Hunter: Greed Island (2003) – Wing , Jispa , Bara
Hunter × Hunter G I Final (2004) – Bara , Jispa , Montreux , Zetsk Bellam
Bleach: The Sealed Sword Frenzy (2005) – Gin Ichimaru
Dogs: Bullets & Carnage (2009) – Ian
Initial D Extra Stage Impact Blue (xxxx) – Nogami
Kamen Rider Den-O Collection DVD "Imagin Anime" (xxxx) – Urataros
Saint Seiya: The Lost Canvas (xxxx) – Scorpio Kardia
The Prince of Tennis: The National Tournament Semifinals (xxxx) – Osamu Watanabe
Sex Pistols (xxxx) – Hoikushi
Black Butler (2015) – Lau

Original net animation (ONA)
Bastard!! (2023) – Zion Sol Vanderverg

Theatrical animation
Crayon Shin-chan: Serious Battle! Robot Dad Strikes Back (2014) – Jintaro Kuroiwa
Farewell, My Dear Cramer: First Touch (2021) – Kōzō Samejima
Mobile Suit Gundam: Cucuruz Doan's Island (2022) – Yun Sanho

Video games
Mermaid Prism (2006)
Nier Replicant (2010) – Nier
Fate/Extra CCC (2013) – Karna
Fate/Grand Order (2015) – Sakata Kintoki, Karna
Fate/Extella (2016) – Karna
JoJo's Bizarre Adventure: All Star Battle (PlayStation 3) (2013) - Noriaki Kakyoin
Genshin Impact (2020) – Baizhu
Punishing: Gray Raven (2022) - Roland
Unknown date
Ar tonelico II – Croix Bartel
Bleach: Kurenai ni Somaru Soul Society – Gin Ichimaru
Bleach: Erabareshi Tarashii – Gin Ichimaru
Bleach GC: Tasogare ni Mamieru Shinigami – Gin Ichimaru
Bleach: The Blade of Fate – Gin Ichimaru
Bleach: Kokui Hirameki Requiem – Gin Ichimaru
Bleach: Hanaterashi Yabou – Gin Ichimaru
Bleach: Blade Battlers – Gin Ichimaru
Bleach: Blade Battlers 2nd – Gin Ichimaru
Bleach: Shattered Blade – Gin Ichimaru
Bleach: Heat the Soul 2 – Gin Ichimaru
Bleach: Heat the Soul 3 – Gin Ichimaru
Bleach: Heat the Soul 4 – Gin Ichimaru
Bleach: Soul Resurrección – Gin Ichimaru
Dear Girl ~Stories~ Hibiki – Teran Ikkemen
Hakuoki Shinsengumi Kitan – Harada Sanosuke
Hakuoki Zuisouroku – Harada Sanosuke
Hakuoki Shinsengumi Kitan (PSP) – Harada Sanosuke
Hakuoki Shinsengumi Kitan (PS3) – Harada Sanosuke
Hakuoki Yugiroku – Harada Sanosuke
JoJo's Bizarre Adventure: All-Star Battle – Noriaki Kakyoin
Kamen Rider: Climax Heroes series – Kamen Rider Den-O Rod Form, Kamen Rider Den-O Super Climax Form
Kichiku Megane – Midou Takanori
Lucky Dog 1 – Bernardo Ortolani
NORN9 – Kagami Itsuki
Rogue Galaxy – Young Dorgengoa, Gale Dorban
Sonic the Hedgehog series – Shadow the Hedgehog
Super Smash Bros. Brawl – Shadow the Hedgehog
Super Smash Bros. for Nintendo 3DS and Wii U - Shadow the Hedgehog
Super Smash Bros. Ultimate - Shadow the Hedgehog
Starry☆Sky – Iku Mizushima
Tales of Hearts – Chlorseraph
Tales of Xillia 2 – Redau
Yu-Gi-Oh-GX Tag Force – Fubuki Tenjoin
Yu-Gi-Oh-GX Tag Force 2 – Fubuki Tenjoin
Yu-Gi-Oh-GX Tag Force 3 – Fubuki Tenjoin

Drama CDs

Abunai Series 3: Abunai Bara to Yuri no Sono – Michiru Kagetsuin
Abunai Series 5: Abunai Shiawase Chou Bangaihen – Michiru Kagetsuin & Ran Saionji
Ai de Kitsuku Shibaritai ~Koi Yori Hageshiku~ – Kazuma Fujimoto
Aiso Tsukashi – Takatsudo
Aitsu to Scandal series 2: Houkago wa Scandal – Hisashi Douzenji
Ai wa Bara Iro no Kiss – Hikaru
Akazukin to Mayoi no Mori – Yamaneko-san
Attack on Titan – Farlan Church
Bara no Hanabira – Hosaka
Beauty & Ghost – Satou Seiji
Benriya-san – Tarou Yamada
Bishou no Neya ni Haberu Yoru
Broadcast wo Toppatsure! – Mizuki Kitaoka
Brother – Hiragi Mitsuo
Bukiyou na Silent – Yuuji Sagara
Egoist no Junai – Daisuke Matsubae
Endless series 3: Endless Love – Kanzaki
Faster than a Kiss – Kazuma Ojiro
Gerard & Jacques – Jacques
GetBackers – Suiha Koyanagi
Goshujinsama to Inu – Taira
Gouka Kyakusen de Koi wa Hajimaru series 7 – Albert
Hanayome wa Yoru ni Chiru – Takaki Ei
Hatoful Boyfriend – Yuuya Sakazaki
Hisoyaka na Jounetsu series – Yamaoka
Hoigakusha to Keiji no Aisho Series 1: Hoigakusha to Keiji no Aisho – Atsushi Fuyuki
Hoigakusha to Keiji no Aisho Series 2: Hoigakusha to Keiji no Honne – Atsushi Fuyuki
Honey Boys Spiral – Akiya Ousono
Innai Kansen – Iori Sawamura
Kakehiki wa Bed No Ue De – Uesugi
Karneval – Tsukitaichi
Kawaii Geboku no Sodatekata
Kichiku Megane - Megane Hisouchaku Ban I, II – Midou Takanori
Kichiku Megane - Megane Souchaku Ban I, II – Midou Takanori
Kimi ga Inakerya Iki mo Dekinai – Nanao Kanae
Kimi ga Koi ni Ochiru – Reiichirou
Kimi ga Koi ni Oboreru – Reiichirou
Kimi ga Suki Nanosa – Sasaki
Kiraini Naranai dene – Touichirou Kashiwagi
Kiss x Kiss – Kitamura Kou
Kono Ai ni Hizamazuke – Fuyuki Suwa
Kono Ai wo Kurae – Yuusuke Tsuda
Konoyo Ibun Series 1: Konoyo Ibun – Tetsushi Hatoki
Konoyo Ibun Series 2: Sono no San – Tetsushi Hatoki
Kyūso wa Chiizu no Yume o Miru – Imagase Wataru
Mujihi Na Otoko – Shirahane Nanao
Mujihi Na Anata – Shirahane Nanao
Naguru Hakui no Tenshi – Harutsugu Masamune
Nijuurasen series 2: Aijou Sabaku – Kazushi Ousaka
Otokonoko niwa Himitsu ga Aru Series 2 & 3 – Nakatsugawa
Pearl series 2: Yokubari na Pearl – Touya
Pearl series 3: Wagamama na Pearl – Touya
Pearl series 4: Kimagure na Pearl – Touya
Punch Up! – Shinobu Hishiya
Recipe – Satoshi Kunohara
Ryū no Hanawazurai – Kuwan
Saihate no Kimi e – Saiga
Saint Seiya Episode.G – Galan
Saudade – Yukinari Shizuka
Senzoku de Aishite – Tomoki Aida
Sex Pistols #2 – Narrator
Shiawase ni Shite Agemasu – Mayumi Nikaidou
Shosen Kedamono Series 2: Youko Nitsumaru – Rikka
Shosen Kedamono Series side story 2: Souko Gekka ni Hohoemu – Younger Souko/Green Hair
Sojou no Koi wa Nido Haneru – Wataru Imagase
Sono Kuchibiru ni Yoru no Tsuyu – Tatsuki Wada
Sora ni Hibiku Ryuu no Utagoe – Ryusei
Soshite Koi ga Hajimaru – Iida
Starry☆Sky – Iku Mizushima
Subete wa Kono Yoru ni – Ryouichi Suzuhara
Tendre Voyou 6/ Mujihi Na Otoko – Nanao Shirahane
Tenshi no Naku Yoru – Tamiya Tomonori
Tora Nii-san To Wanko-san – Tora-san
Tora-san To Ookami-san – Tora-san
Tsuki ni Ookami – Suou
Tsumi series – Masami Tomioka
Wabi to Erosu no Okeiko
Wasurenaide Itekure – Seiryou Moriya
Yandere Heaven – Hajime
Yuki yo Ringo no Ka no Gotoku – Katsura Eiji
Yume Musubi, Koi Musubi – Shuuji Chizusu
Yuuwaku - Temptation – Ryoichi Sakisaka

Dubbing roles

Live-action
Cillian Murphy
Batman Begins – Doctor Jonathan Crane
Red Eye – Jackson "Jack" Rippner
The Dark Knight – Doctor Jonathan Crane
The Dark Knight Rises – Doctor Jonathan Crane
As Good as It Gets – Vincent Lopiano (Skeet Ulrich)
Atomic Twister – Potter (Johnny Blick)
The Beach – Étienne (Guillaume Canet)
Boy Meets World – Ronny
Burning – Ben (Steven Yeun)
The Dark Knight – Coleman Reese (Joshua Harto)
Dr. Dolittle 2 – Pepito (Jacob Vargas)
Fight Club – The Mechanic (Holt McCallany)
Gotham – Harvey Dent (Nicholas D'Agosto)
Idle Hands – Randy (Jack Noseworthy)
Jason X – Waylander (Derwin Jordan)
Joey – Michael Tribbiani (Paulo Costanzo)
Kamen Rider: Dragon Knight – Drew Lansing/Kamen Rider Torque
The Lovers – Robert (Aidan Gillen)
The Outer Limits – Agent Pinter (Robert Moloney)
Primal Fear – Roy/Aaron Stampler (Edward Norton)
Ninja Turtles: The Next Mutation – Leonardo
Power Rangers Turbo – Elgar, Phantom Ranger
Power Rangers in Space – Elgar, Phantom Ranger, Psycho Blue
Power Rangers: Lost Galaxy – Chameliac, Psycho Blue
Power Rangers: Samurai – Jayden Shiba/Red Samurai Ranger (Alex Heartman)
Showtime – Charlie Hertz (John Cariani)
X2: X-Men United (2006 TV Asahi edition) – Iceman (Shawn Ashmore)

Animation
Babar (TV series) – Cornelius
The Emoji Movie – Nerd Emoji
The Powerpuff Girls – Professor Dick Hardley, Major Glory
Transformers Animated – Prowl
SpongeBob SquarePants series - Squidward Tentacles (Season 9, Little Yellow Book)

References

External links
 
 Kōji Yusa at GamePlaza-Haruka Voice Acting Database 
 Kōji Yusa at Hitoshi Doi's Seiyuu Database
 

1968 births
Living people
Japanese male video game actors
Japanese male voice actors
Male voice actors from Kyoto
20th-century Japanese male actors
21st-century Japanese male actors